The Colorado Rockies forests is a temperate coniferous forest ecoregion of the United States.

Setting
This ecoregion is located in the highest ranges of the Rocky Mountains, in central and western Colorado, northern New Mexico and southeastern Wyoming, and experiences a dry continental climate.

Flora
The dominant vegetation type of this ecoregion is coniferous forest. In contrast with Rocky Mountain ecoregions to the north, lodgepole pine is rather rare, replaced by Ponderosa pine (Pinus ponderosa) and trembling aspen (Populus tremuloides). Rocky Mountain Douglas-fir (Pseudotsuga menziesii subsp. glauca) and Engelmann spruce (Picea engelmanni) can also be found in the mountain forests. Bristlecone pine (Pinus aristata) is the dominant plant at the tree line/krummholz zone. Aside from coniferous forests, the ecoregion contains meadows, foothill grasslands, riparian woodlands and alpine tundra.

Fauna
Mammals include elk (Cervus canadensis), mule deer (Odocoileus hemonius), black bear (Ursus americanus), wolverine (Gulo gulo), North American cougar (Puma concolor), Canada lynx (Lynx canadensis), and American marten (Martes americana). Grizzly bears (Ursus arctos horribilis) may exist in this region but there has not been a confirmed sighting of a grizzly in Colorado since 1979. A load of bird species are found in this region including black-billed magpies (Pica hudsonia), Canada jays (Perisoreus canadensi), Steller's jay (Cyanocitta stelleri), broad-tailed hummingbirds (Selasphorus platycerus), dark-eyed juncos (Junco hyemalis), and the threatened brown-capped rosy-finches (Leucosticte australis) and black rosy-finches (Leucosticte atrata).

Threats and preservation
While this ecoregion is listed as "relatively stable/intact", it is threatened by logging, mining, oil and gas development, recreational-residential construction, domestic livestock grazing and introduction of exotic species. Protected areas include Rocky Mountain National Park and Indian Peaks Wilderness in north-central Colorado, South San Juan Wilderness in south-central Colorado, Carson National Forest in north-central New Mexico and Medicine Bow – Routt National Forest in southeastern Wyoming.

See also
List of ecoregions in the United States (WWF)
Southern Rocky Mountains
Rocky Mountain ponderosa pine forest
Rocky Mountains subalpine zone

References

External links
National Geographic.org: Colorado Rockies forests ecoregion

Forests of the Rocky Mountains
Rockies, Colorado
Forests of Colorado
Forests of New Mexico
Forests of Wyoming
Ecoregions of the United States
Colorado Rockies
Rockies, Colorado
Nearctic ecoregions